Valery Viktorovich  Postnikov  (19 July 1945 – 3 February 2016) was a Soviet and Russian ice hockey player and coach including Honored Coach of Russia (1992).

As a hockey player he finished his career at 24 years due to injury, and was a graduate of the Chelyabinsk Institute of Physical Education.

As a coach he led the team Metallurg Magnitogorsk (1971–76; 2007–08), farm club Traktor Chelyabinsk (1976–78), Metallist Petropavlovsk (1978-1979), Molot-Prikamye Perm (1997–99; 2002–04) and HC Lada Togliatti (1999-2001).

References

External links
 Магнитогорский металл: Валерий Постников
 Зал славы «Металлурга»
 ТРЕНЕР ДО ПОСЛЕДНЕЙ СЕКУНДЫ

1945 births
2016 deaths
Honoured Coaches of Russia
Metallurg Magnitogorsk players
Soviet ice hockey players
Sportspeople from Stavropol
Soviet ice hockey coaches
Russian ice hockey coaches